Travanca may refer to the following places in Portugal:

 Travanca (Amarante), a civil parish in the municipality of Amarante
 Travanca (Cinfães), a civil parish in the municipality of Cinfães 
 Travanca (Mogadouro), a civil parish in the municipality of Mogadouro
 Travanca (Oliveira de Azeméis), a civil parish in the municipality of Oliveira de Azeméis 
 Travanca (Santa Maria da Feira), a civil parish in the municipality of Santa Maria da Feira
 Travanca (Vinhais), a civil parish in the municipality of Vinhais
 Travanca de Lagos, a civil parish in the municipality of Oliveira do Hospital
 Travanca de Tavares, a civil parish in the municipality of Mangualde
 Travanca do Mondego, a civil parish in the municipality of Penacova
 Travancas, a civil parish in Chaves